Marian Nowara (born 6 December 1935) is a Polish footballer. He played in two matches for the Poland national football team in 1958.

References

External links
 

1935 births
Living people
Polish footballers
Poland international footballers
Place of birth missing (living people)
Association footballers not categorized by position